Belle Eagle is an unincorporated rural community in Northern Haywood County, Tennessee, United States. Belle Eagle is located seven miles north of Brownsville on Tennessee State Route 54. The Green, Herd, Lee, Lewis, Macon, Mullen, Parks, Taylor, Thornton, Walker, and Williams families were among the early settlers. Some of the land was developed as early as 1820. Much of the area remains in large family farms.

Businesses through the years included:
Gristmill owned by Edgar Parks
Blacksmith Shop operated by Joel Harrell, later by Tom Pruitt
Barber Shop operated by Z. T. Norman
Sawmill and Cotton Gin, co-owned by Mrs. Bessie Bradford Sorrelle and A. A. Mann
General Store operated by Mr. Dedmon, later by Earl Mullen, then Mr. Boggs.
New Store, built by Earl Mullen also had a laundromat and okra buying center

Members of the original families still living in Belle Eagle in 2008 were Bishop, Jameson, Lee, Lewis, Mann, Macon, Roberts, Sorrelle, Sikes, Wiggington and White.

A volunteer fire department is housed in the old one-room Bradford school building which was closed when all schools were consolidated in Brownsville.

References

Unincorporated communities in Tennessee
Unincorporated communities in Haywood County, Tennessee